Music Spoken Here is an album by John McLaughlin, released in 1982 through Warner Music Group. The album reached number 24 in the Billboard Jazz Albums chart 1983.

Track listing 
"Aspan" (John McLaughlin) – 5:42
"Blues for L.W." (McLaughlin) – 6:21
"The Translators" (McLaughlin) – 2:38
"Honky-Tonk Haven"  (McLaughlin, Shankar) – 4:08
"Viene Clareando" (Segundo Aredes, Atahualpa Yupanqui) – 0:32
"David" (McLaughlin) – 7:47
"Negative Ions" (McLaughlin) – 3:52
"Brise De Coeur" (McLaughlin) – 5:20
"Loro" (Egberto Gismonti) – 2:11

Personnel 
 John McLaughlin – guitar
 Katia Labèque – keyboards
 François Couturier – keyboards
 Jean Paul Celea – bass
 Tommy Campbell – drums
Production
 Jean Luis Rizeri – chief engineer
 Laurent Peyron – assistant engineer
 Dominique Isserman – group photo
 Hipgnosis/STD/APP/Assorted iMaGes – sleeve

Chart performance

References 

1982 albums
John McLaughlin (musician) albums
Albums with cover art by Hipgnosis
Warner Music Group albums